PWD Bamenda is a Cameroonian football club based in the City of Bamenda, Northwest Region They currently compete in the Elite One, the highest football league in Cameroon.

PWD Bamenda won their maiden domestic and first Elite One title in 2020 after they were crowned champions since the season couldn't be completed due to the effects of thethey also went on to win the Cameroon cup after beating Astres of Douala (1-0) through a free kick transformed by Chem thereby setting them a place for CAF confederations Cup preliminaries.They failed to make it to the playoffs of the league COVID-19 pandemic.

This club has several names among which are P-ton ton and Abakwa boys and is one of the oldest clubs in Cameroon, the flag bearer of the North West Region of Cameroon alongside YOSA their archrivals.

MAIN RIVALS:Yong Sports Academy of Bamenda "YOSA",Coton Sport of Garoua

Stadium
The team's official home ground is the 2500 capacity Bamenda Municipal Stadium undergoing some renovation works since 2013. Due to these works, PWD plays home games at the University Of Bamenda campus fields and YONG Sports Complexe at Mile 5 Nkwen-Bamenda.

Honours
Elite One
Champions: 2019–20
Cameroon Cup
Champions: 2021

Performance in CAF competitions
CAF Champions League
2020–21 – Qualifying round

CAF Confederation Cup
2004 – First round

References

External links

Football clubs in Cameroon
Sports clubs in Cameroon